Gilles Doucende (born January 6, 1977 in Cavaillon, Vaucluse) is a French professional football player. Currently, he plays in the Championnat de France amateur for US Le Pontet.

He played on the professional level in Ligue 1 and Ligue 2 for OGC Nice.

1977 births
Living people
People from Cavaillon
French footballers
Ligue 1 players
Ligue 2 players
OGC Nice players
Grenoble Foot 38 players
US Pontet Grand Avignon 84 players
FC Villefranche Beaujolais players
Association football midfielders
Sportspeople from Vaucluse
Footballers from Provence-Alpes-Côte d'Azur